Homo naledi is an extinct species of archaic human discovered in 2013 in the Rising Star Cave, Cradle of Humankind, South Africa dating to the Middle Pleistocene 335,000–236,000 years ago. The initial discovery comprises 1,550 specimens, representing 737 different elements, and at least 15 different individuals. Despite this exceptionally high number of specimens, their classification with other Homo remains unclear.

Along with similarities to contemporary Homo, they share several characteristics with the ancestral Australopithecus and early Homo as well (mosaic evolution), most notably a small cranial capacity of 465–610 cm3 (28.4–37.2 cu in), compared to 1,270–1,330 cm3 (78–81 cu in) in modern humans. Nonetheless, H. naledi brain anatomy seems to have been similar to contemporary Homo, which could indicate comparable cognitive complexity. The persistence of small-brained humans for so long in the midst of bigger-brained contemporaries revises the previous conception that a larger brain would necessarily lead to an evolutionary advantage, and their mosaic anatomy greatly expands the known range of variation for the genus.

H. naledi anatomy indicates that, though they were capable of long-distance travel with a humanlike stride and gait, they were more arboreal than other Homo, better adapted to climbing and suspensory behaviour in trees than endurance running. Tooth anatomy suggests consumption of gritty foods covered in particulates such as dust or dirt. Though they have not been associated with stone tools or any indication of material culture, they appear to have been dextrous enough to produce and handle tools, and likely manufactured Early or Middle Stone Age industries. It has also been controversially postulated that these individuals were given funerary rites, and were carried into and placed in the chamber. In December 2022, suggestions that H. naledi used fire for light and cooking were reported.

Discovery 

On 13 September 2013 while exploring the Rising Star Cave system in the Cradle of Humankind, South Africa, cavers Rick Hunter and Steven Tucker found hominin fossils at the bottom of the Dinaledi Chamber. On the 24th, they returned to the chamber and took photos, which they showed to South African palaeoanthropologists Pedro Boshoff and Lee Rogers Berger on October 1. Berger subsequently assembled an excavation team which included Hunter and Tucker, the so-called "Underground Astronauts".

The chamber had been entered at least once before, by cavers in the early 1990s. They rearranged some bones and may have caused further damage, although much of the floor in the chamber had not been walked on prior to 2013. In total, more than 1,550 pieces of bone belonging to at least fifteen individuals (9 immature and 6 adults) have been recovered from the clay-rich sediments. Berger and colleagues published the findings in 2015.

The fossils represent 737 anatomical elements – including the parts of the skull, jaw, ribs, teeth, limbs, and inner ear bones – from old, adult, young, and infantile individuals. There are also some articulated or near-articulated elements, including the skull with the jaw bone, and nearly complete hands and feet. With the number of individuals of both sexes across several age demographics, it is the richest assemblage of associated fossil hominins discovered in Africa. Aside from the Sima de los Huesos collection and later Neanderthal and modern human samples, the excavation site has the most comprehensive representation of skeletal elements across the lifespan, and from multiple individuals, in the hominin fossil record.

The holotype specimen, DH1, comprises a male partial calvaria (top of the skull), partial maxilla, and nearly complete jawbone. The paratypes, DH2 through DH5, all comprise partial calvaria. Berger and colleagues named the species Homo naledi, the species name meaning "star" in the Sotho language, because the remains came from Rising Star Cave.

The remains of at least three additional individuals (two adults and a child) were reported in the Lesedi Chamber of the cave by John Hawks and colleagues in 2017.

Classification 
In 2017, the Dinaledi remains were dated to 335,000–236,000 years ago in the Middle Pleistocene, using electron spin resonance (ESR) and uranium–thorium (U-Th) dating on three teeth, and U-Th and paleomagnetic dating of the sediments they were deposited in. The fossils were previously thought to have dated to 1~2 million years ago because no similarly small-brained hominins had previously been known from such a recent date in Africa (the smaller-brained Homo floresiensis of Indonesia lived on an isolated island, and apparently went extinct shortly after the arrival of modern humans.) The ability of such a small-brained hominin to have survived for so long in the midst of bigger-brained Homo greatly revises previous conceptions of human evolution and the notion that a larger brain would necessarily lead to an evolutionary advantage. Their mosaic anatomy also greatly expands the range of variation for the genus.

H. naledi is hypothesised to have branched off very early from contemporaneous Homo. It is unclear whether they branched off at around the time of H. habilis, H. rudolfensis, and A. sediba; are a sister taxon to H. erectus and the contemporaneous large-brained Homo; or are a sister taxon to the descendants of H. heidelbergensis (modern humans and Neanderthals). This would mean that they branched off from contemporary Homo at latest before 900,000 years ago, and possibly as early as the Pliocene. It is also possible their ancestors speciated after an interbreeding event between Homo and late australopithecines. Looking at the skull, H. naledi has the closest affinities to H. erectus.

It is unclear if these H. naledi were an isolated population in the Cradle of Humankind, or if they ranged across Africa. If the latter, then several gracile hominin fossils across Africa which have traditionally been classified as late H. erectus could potentially represent H. naledi specimens.

Anatomy

Skull 

The Lesedi specimen is more within the range of H. habilis and H. e. georgicus. Nonetheless, the encephalization quotient of H. naledi was estimated at 3.75, which is the same as the pygmy H. floresiensis, but notably smaller than all other Homo. Contemporary Homo were all above 6, H. e. georgicus at 3.55, and A. africanus at 3.81. It is unclear if H. naledi inherited small brain size from the last common Homo ancestor, or if it was evolved secondarily more recently.

The skull shape is more similar to Homo, with a slenderer shape, the presence of temporal and occipital lobes of the brain, and reduced post-orbital constriction (the skull does not become narrower behind the eye-sockets). The frontal lobe morphology is more or less the same in all Homo brains despite size, and differs from Australopithecus, which has been implicated in the production of tools, the development of language, and sociality.

Like modern humans, but unlike fossil hominins (including South African australopithecines, H. erectus, and Neanderthals), the permanent 2nd molar erupted comparatively late in life, emerging alongside the premolars instead of before, which indicates a slower maturation unusually comparable to modern humans. The tooth formation rate of the front teeth is also most similar to modern humans. The overall size and shape of the molars most closely resemble those of three unidentified Homo specimens from the local Swartkrans and East African Koobi Fora Caves, and are similar in size (but not shape) to Pleistocene H. sapiens. The necks of the molars are proportionally similar to those of A. afarensis and Paranthropus. Unlike modern humans and contemporary Homo, H. naledi lacks several accessory dental features, and has a high frequency of individuals who present main cusps, namely the metacone (midline on the tongue-side) and hypocone (to the right on the lip-side) on the 2nd and 3rd molars, and a Y-shaped hypoconulid (a ridge on the lip-side towards the cheek) on all 3 molars. Nonetheless, H. naledi also has many dental similarities with contemporary Homo.

The anvil (a middle ear bone) more resembles those of chimps, gorillas, and Paranthropus than Homo. Like H. habilis and H. erectus, H. naledi has a well-developed brow-ridge with a fissure stretching across just above the ridge, and like H. erectus a pronounced occipital bun. H. naledi has some facial similarities with H. rudolfensis.

Build 

This body mass is intermediate between what is typically seen in Australopithecus and Homo species. Like other Homo, male and female H. naledi were likely about the same size, males on average about 20% larger than females. A juvenile specimen, DH7, is skeletally consistent with a growth rate similar to the faster ape-like trajectories of MH1 (A. sediba) and Turkana boy (H. ergaster). However, because dental development is so similar to that of modern humans, a slower maturation rate is not completely out of the question. Using the faster growth rate, DH7 would have died at 8–11 years old, but using the slower growth, DH7 would have died at 11–15 years old.

Concerning the spine, only the 10th and 11th thoracic vertebrae (in the chest region) are preserved from presumably a single individual, which are proportionally similar to those of contemporary Homo, though are the smallest recorded of any hominin. The two transverse processes of the vertebra, which jut out diagonally, are most similar to those of Neanderthals. The neural canals within are proportionally large, similar to modern humans, Neanderthals, and H. e. georgicus. The 11th rib is straight like that of A. afarensis, and the 12th rib is robust in cross-section like that of Neanderthals. Like Neanderthals, the 12th rib appears to have supported strong intercostal muscles above, and a strong quadratus lumborum muscle below. However, unlike Neanderthals, there was weak attachment to the diaphragm. Overall, this H. naledi specimen appears to have been small-bodied compared to other Homo, though it is unclear if this single specimen is representative of the species.

The shoulders are more similar to those of australopithecines, with the shoulder blade situated higher on the back and farther from the midline, short clavicles, and little or no humeral torsion. Elevated shoulder and clavicle bones indicate a narrow chest. The pelvis and legs have features reminiscent of Australopithecus, including anterposteriorly compressed (from front to back) femoral necks, mediolaterally compressed (from left to right) tibiae, and a somewhat circular fibular neck; which indicate a wide abdomen. This combination would preclude efficient endurance running in H. naledi, unlike H. erectus and descendants. Instead, H. naledi appears to have been more arboreal.

Limbs 

The metacarpal bone of the thumb was well-developed, which is used in holding and manipulating large objects, and had strong crests to support its opponens pollicis muscle used in precision-pinch gripping, and its thenar muscles. This is more similar to other Homo than Australopithecus. H. naledi appears to have had strong flexor pollicis longus muscles like modern humans, with humanlike palm and finger pads, which are important in forceful gripping between the thumb and fingers. However, unlike Homo, the H. naledi thumb metacarpal joint is comparably small relative to the thumb's length, and the thumb phalangeal joint is flattened. The distal thumb phalanx bone is robust, and proportionally more similar to those of H. habilis and P. robustus.

The metacarpals of the other fingers share adaptations with modern humans and Neanderthals to cup and manipulate objects, and the wrist joint is overall comparable to that of modern humans and Neanderthals. Conversely, the proximal phalanges are curved and are almost identical to those of A. afarensis and H. habilis, which is interpreted as an adaptation for climbing and suspensory behaviour. Such curvature is more pronounced in adults than juveniles, suggesting that adults climbed just as much or more so than juveniles, and this behaviour was commonly done. The fingers are also proportionally longer than those of any other fossil hominin (other than the arboreal Ardipithecus ramidus and a modern human specimen from Qafzeh cave, Israel) which is also consistent with climbing behaviour.

H. naledi was a biped and stood upright. Like other Homo, they had strong insertion for the gluteus muscles, well-defined linea aspera (a ridge running down the back of the femur), thick patellae, long tibiae, and gracile fibulae. These indicate that they were capable of long-distance travel. The H. naledi foot was similar to that of modern humans and other Homo, with adaptations for bipedalism and a humanlike gait. However, the heel bone has a low orientation, comparable to those of non-human great apes, and the ankle bone has a low declination, which possibly indicate the foot would have been subtly stiffer during the stance phase of walking before the foot pushed off the ground.

Pathology 
The adult right mandible U.W. 101-1142 has a bony lesion, suggestive of a benign tumour. The individual would have experienced some swelling and localised discomfort, but the tumour's position near the medial pterygoid muscle (likely causing discomfort on the jaw hinge) may have impeded function of the muscle, and changed elevation of the right side of the jaw.

Dental defects in H. naledi specimens during 1.6–2.8 and 4.3–7.6 months of development were most likely caused by seasonal stressors. This may have been due to extreme summer and winter temperatures causing food scarcity. Environmental stressors are consistent with present-day flu seasons in South Africa peaking during winter, and paediatric diarrhoea hospitalisation being most frequent at the height of the rainy season in summer.

Local hominins were likely preyed upon by large carnivores, such as lions, leopards, and hyaenas. However, there seems to be a distinct paucity of large carnivore remains from the northern end of the Cradle of Humankind, where Rising Star Cave is located, possibly because carnivores preferred the Blaaubank River to the south which may have offered better hunting grounds with a greater abundance of large prey items. Alternatively, because many more sites are known in the south than the north, carnivore spatial patterns may not be well-represented by the fossil record (preservation bias).

Culture

Food 
Dental chipping and wearing indicates the habitual consumption of small hard objects, such as dirt and dust, and cup-shaped wearing on the back teeth may have stemmed from gritty particles. These could have originated from unwashed roots and tubers. Alternatively, aridity could have stirred up particulates onto food items, coating food in dust. It is possible that they commonly ate larger hard items, such as seeds and nuts, but these were processed into smaller pieces before consumption. Whatever the case, H. naledi occupied a seemingly unique niche from previous South African hominins, including Australopithecus and Paranthropus. However, the teeth of all 3 species indicate that they needed to exert high shearing force to chew through perhaps plant or muscle fibres. The teeth of other Homo cannot produce such high forces perhaps due to the use of some food processing techniques, such as cooking. In December 2022, suggestions that H. naledi used fire for light and cooking were reported.

Technology 
Though H. naledi remains are not associated with any stone tools, it is likely they produced Early Stone Age (Acheulean and possibly the earlier Oldawan) or Middle Stone Age industries because they have the same adaptations to the hand as other human species which are implicated in tool production. H. naledi is the only identified human species to have existed during the early Middle Stone Age of the Highveld region, South Africa, possibly indicating that this species manufactured and maintained this tradition at least during this time period. Such industries and stone cutting techniques likely evolved independently several times among different Homo species and populations, or were transported over long distances by the inventors or apprentices and taught.

Funerals 

In 2015, archaeologist Paul Dirks, Berger, and colleagues concluded that the bodies had to have been deliberately carried and placed into the chamber by people because they appear to have been intact when they were first deposited in the chamber (no evidence of trauma by being dropped into the chamber nor of predation, and exceptional preservation), the chamber is inaccessible to large predators, the chamber appears to be an isolated system and has never been flooded (that is, natural forces were not at play), there is no hidden shaft by which people could have accidentally fallen in through, and there is no evidence of some catastrophe which killed all the individuals inside the chamber. They said it is also possible that the bodies were dropped down a chute and fell slowly due to irregularity and narrowness of the path down, or a soft mud cushion to land on. In both scenarios, the morticians would have required artificial light to navigate the cave; and the site was used repeatedly for burials as the bodies were not all deposited at the same time.

In 2016, palaeoanthropologist Aurore Val countered that such preservation may have been due to mummification rather than careful burial, and the absence of long bone heads is reminiscent of predation, and she believes that discounting natural forces such as flooding for depositing the bodies is unjustified. Further, there is evidence of damage done by beetles, beetle larvae, and snails (which facilitate decomposition); but, the chamber does not present ideal conditions for snails, nor does it contain snail shells, which would indicate decomposition actually initiated before deposition in the chamber.

Nonetheless, in 2017, Dirks, Berger, and colleagues reaffirmed that there is no evidence of water flow into the cave, and that it is more likely that these H. naledi were buried in the chamber. They also said it is possible that they were buried by contemporary Homo, such as the ancestors of modern humans, rather than other H. naledi, but, nonetheless, that the cultural behaviour of funerary practises is not impossible for H. naledi, and burial in the chamber may have been done to remove decaying bodies from a settlement, prevent scavengers, or due to social bonding and grief.

In 2018, anthropologist Charles Egeland and colleagues echoed Val's sentiments, and stated that there is insufficient evidence to conclude that human species had developed a concept of the afterlife so early in time. They also said that the preservation of the Dinaledi individuals is similar to those of baboon carcasses which accumulate in caves (either by natural death of cave-dwelling baboons or by a leopard dragging in carcasses).

In 2021, following the analysis of the bone fragments of an immature individual, Juliet Brophy and Berger once again claimed "We hypothesize that the cranial remains and teeth that we  have  collected  at  U.W.  110  have  resulted  from in situ fragmentation  of  a  partial  or  complete  cranium  deposited  in  this  remote  location.  We  regard  it  as  likely  that  some  hominin agency was involved in the deposition of the cranial material."

Gallery

See also

References

Further reading

External links 

 Reconstructions of H. naledi by palaeoartist John Gurche
 
 
 
 
 
 

Early species of Homo
Pleistocene primates
Prehistoric mammals of Africa
Fossils of South Africa
Fossil taxa described in 2015
Mammals described in 2015
Taxa named by Lee Rogers Berger
2013 archaeological discoveries